RCH (Replicar Hellas, formerly Beetlekitcars) was founded in 2007 in Katerini, Greece, by Elias Gaganelis, and produces high-quality replicas, mostly of older Porsche models. These include a variety of types based on the 356 Speedster, as well as the 550 Spyder, while models based on the Volkswagen Beetle have also been produced. For several years, the cars could not be legally sold in Greece, with all produced cars exported, mostly to European countries (sales in Greece were only allowed since 2014). In late 2016 the company introduced a Beach Buggy model of its own development.

External links/References 
L.S. Skartsis, "Greek Vehicle & Machine Manufacturers 1800 to present: A Pictorial History", Marathon (2012)  (Open Access eBook)
RCH 356 Speedster (article in Autocarnet.gr)
Company website
RCH Austria
RCH Spain
RCH Buggy model introduction

References

Car manufacturers of Greece
Retro-style automobiles
Companies based in Katerini
Greek brands